Hirculops cornifer, the highbrow rockskipper, is a species of combtooth blenny found in the western Indian ocean. This species reaches a length of  SL. This species is the only known member of its genus.

References

Salarinae
Monotypic fish genera
Fish described in 1830